Michel Fournier (1945 – December 2008) was a French cinematographer.

Career
Fournier is most famous for his early collaborations with director Philippe Garrel. He has also worked with French director Luc Moullet. He worked as cinematographer on the following French films: Marie pour mémoire, Le Révélateur, Acéphale, La Concentration, Le Lit de la vierge, La Cicatrice intérieure, Athanor, and Anatomie d’un rapport.

References

External links

French cinematographers
1945 births
2008 deaths